{{safesubst:#invoke:RfD|||month = March
|day = 19
|year = 2023
|time = 13:40
|timestamp = 20230319134026

|content=
REDIRECT Phillipe-Ignace François Aubert de Gaspé 

}}